Peter Oxendale (b. ) is an English forensic musicologist and an expert witness on copyright infringement in music. He was involved as an expert in the notable Blurred Lines lawsuit. He was a keyboardist in the glam rock bands Sparks and Jet and musical director for Chris de Burgh. Oxendale also played keyboards on Ian Hunter's Overnight Angels album in 1977. He also played keyboards for the new wave bands Dead or Alive and Frankie Goes to Hollywood. In 1983, he served as touring keyboardist for John Foxx. In 1983/4, he appeared numerous times on Top Of The Pops as part of Bonnie Tyler's band on her long running number one hit "Total Eclipse Of The Heart."

Sources

References

External links

1952 births
Living people
English rock keyboardists
Dead or Alive (band) members